Laccophilus mexicanus is a species of predaceous diving beetle in the family Dytiscidae. It is found in North America and the Neotropics.

Subspecies
These three subspecies belong to the species Laccophilus mexicanus:
 Laccophilus mexicanus atristernalis Crotch, 1873
 Laccophilus mexicanus mexicanus Aubé, 1838
 Laccophilus mexicanus oaxacensis Zimmerman, 1970

References

Further reading

 
 

Dytiscidae
Articles created by Qbugbot
Beetles described in 1838